The oldfield mouse or beach mouse (Peromyscus polionotus), is a nocturnal species of rodent in the family Cricetidae and primarily eats seeds. It lives in holes throughout the Southeastern United States in beaches and sandy fields. Predators to these mice include birds and mammals. In 2010, these mice were in the least concern category on the IUCN Red List with certain subspecies classified as extinct or near threatened.

Distribution and habitat
The oldfield mouse occurs only in the southeastern United States, ranging from Florida to Tennessee. They primarily live in beaches and sandy fields.

Description
The mouse has fawn-colored upperparts and grey to white underparts through most of its range, but on white sandy beaches, the mouse is light or even white. Inland populations are darker and smaller with shorter tails that are dusky above and white below. General body and tail color may vary slightly depending upon geographical location.

Behavior
The mouse is primarily nocturnal.

Diet
P. polionotus is omnivorous and the principal diet is seasonal seeds of wild grasses and forbs, but blackberries, acorns, and wild peas may be consumed.

Shelter
These mice dig holes in earth to create homes. Spiders, snakes, and other animals may move into a burrow.

Reproduction

Survival
Birds and mammals prey upon the oldfield mouse. Various types of parasites can effect oldfield mice, with nematodes being the main ones. One mouse survived in captivity for 5.5 years.

Conservation
In 2010, the beach mouse was in the least concern category on the IUCN Red List. For the beach mouse's subspecies, one is extinct, one was listed critically endangered, four endangered and two near threatened.

References

Footnotes

Works cited

Peromyscus
Mammals described in 1843
Taxonomy articles created by Polbot